Adelaide del Vasto (Adelasia, Azalaïs) ( – 16 April 1118) was countess of Sicily as the third spouse of Roger I of Sicily, and Queen consort of Jerusalem by marriage to Baldwin I of Jerusalem. She served as regent of Sicily during the minority of her son Roger II of Sicily from 1101 until 1112.

Family
She was the daughter of Manfred del Vasto (brother of Boniface del Vasto, marquess of Western Liguria, and Anselm del Vasto).  Her uncle held much political clout in the region of Liguria–a document relating the deeds of Roger I described him as “that most renowned marquis of Italy.”  Her father's family was of Frankish descent of a branch of the Aleramici, sharing a common descent from Aleramo of Montferrat with the marquesses of Montferrat. Her brothers founded the lines of the marquesses of Saluzzo, of Busca, of Lancia, of Ceva, and of Savona.

Her paternal grandparents were Teto II del Vasto, and his wife Bertha of Turin, daughter of margrave Ulric Manfred II of Turin.

Countess consort of Sicily
In 1089, Adelaide married Roger I while her sister married Roger's illegitimate son Jordan. Roger I died in 1101, and Adelaide ruled as regent of Sicily for her young sons Simon and Roger II.  Adelaide herself was quite young when she became regent; she was only about 26 years old at the time. During her tenure, the emir Christodulus rose to preeminence at the court and Palermo was settled as the capital of the realm.

Almost immediately after Adelaide assumed the position of regent, rebellions broke out in parts of Calabria and Sicily.  The writings of the Norman monk Orderic Vitalis recount that Adelaide put an end to these episodes of insurgency with severity. The use of great force in suppressing such rebellions, however, did not tarnish her reputation as a ruler.  In fact, Abbot Alexander of Telese's history of Roger I describes Adelaide as 
“a most prudent woman, [she] exercised the cares of the government and ruled over the county.”   
A Greek and Arab charter from 1109 describes Adelaide as “the great female ruler, the malikah of Sicily and Calabria, the protector of the Christian faith.”  

Adelaide's older son, Simon, was enthroned when he reached the appropriate age (around 8 or 9 years old) but died in 1105, leaving Adelaide regent again until Roger II reached his majority in 1112. Adelaide's second son, Roger II, took control over control of the kingdom in 1112, but there is evidence that Adelaide continued to play a central role in the governing of the island as her signature can still be seen on official documents even after 1112.

Adelaide, and Roger II after her, chose to rule with the help of local officials, rather than importing a retinue of foreign advisors recognizing the great advantage in their familiarity with the island, its people and its cultures.  Similarly, she was careful to donate generously to the local Greek monasteries on Sicily as a way of currying favor with the pre-existing religious authorities.

Either through her influence or under her regency, her brother Henry del Vasto was granted Paternò and Butera. Henry (Enrico) was married to Flandina daughter of Count Roger I. of Calabria and Sicily.

Queen consort of Jerusalem
Meanwhile, in Jerusalem, after the death of Baldwin's first wife Godehilde during the First Crusade, Baldwin married an Armenian noblewoman traditionally known as Arda. Arda was useful in an alliance with the Armenians while Baldwin was Count of Edessa, but when he became King of Jerusalem in 1100 he seemed to have little use for an Armenian wife, and Arda was forced into a convent around 1105.

In 1112 a new marriage was sought for the king. Arnulf of Chocques, Latin Patriarch of Jerusalem, suggested that Baldwin marry Adelaide, as Roger II was now old enough to rule Sicily alone. Baldwin sent ambassadors to Sicily, and somewhat hastily agreed to any terms which Adelaide might have; Adelaide demanded that their son, should they have one, inherit Jerusalem, and if they had no children, the kingdom would pass to her own son Roger II. Adelaide brought with her an enormous amount of badly needed money, as well as some Muslim archers and a thousand other Sicilian soldiers.

Adelaide was already well into middle age and no new heir was immediately forthcoming. The king was blamed for a bigamous marriage (as Arda was still alive) and the Patriarch Arnulf was deposed. Pope Paschal II agreed to reinstate him in 1116, provided that he annul the marriage between Baldwin and Adelaide. Baldwin agreed, after falling ill and assuming that renouncing his sin of bigamy would cure him. In 1117 the annulment was performed at Acre, and Adelaide sailed back to Sicily.

Adelaide died on 16 April 1118 and was buried in Patti. Roger II was outraged at the treatment of his mother and never forgave the Kingdom of Jerusalem. Almost thirty years later, Roger still refused to give assistance to the Crusader states during the Second Crusade.  William of Tyre wrote of the impact of the incident: 
“Adelaide's son was angered beyond measure, because she had been sent back.  He conceived a mortal hatred against the kingdom and its people.  Other Christian princes in various parts of the world, either by coming in person or by giving liberal gifts, have amplified our infant realm. But he and his heirs at the present time have never become reconciled to us to the extent of a single friend word.  Although they could have relieved our necessities by council and aid far more easily than other prince, yet they have always remembered their wrongs and have unjustly avenged upon the whole people the fault of a single individual.”

Sources
Geoffrey Malaterra, "The Deeds of Count Roger of Calabria and Sicily and of his Brother Duke Robert Guiscard", Goffredo Malaterra, fl. 1097, "De rebus gestis Rogerii ...." English translation by Kenneth Baxter Wolf, University of Michigan Press, 2005, Chapter 4.14. pp 189 – 190.
Alio, Jacqueline. 2018. Queens of Sicily 1061-1266. New York: Trinacria.
Bernard Hamilton, "Women in the Crusader States: The Queens of Jerusalem", in Medieval Women, edited by Derek Baker. Ecclesiastical History Society, 1978.
Pasquale Hamel, Adelaide del Vasto, Regina di Gerusalemme. Palermo: Sellerio Editore, 1997.
Alan V. Murray, The Crusader Kingdom of Jerusalem: A Dynastic History, 1099-1125. Prosopographica and Genealogica, 2000.
Brown, Gordon S. 2003. The Norman Conquest of Southern Italy and Sicily. Jefferson: McFarland & Company.
Cilento, Adele and Alessandro Vanoli. 2008. Arabs and Normans in Sicily and the South of Italy. New York: Riverside.
Houben, Hubert. 2002. Roger II of Sicily: A Ruler between East and West. Cambridge: Cambridge University Press.
Loud, Graham A. 2012. Roger II and the Making of the Kingdom of Sicily. Manchester: Manchester University Press.
Mayer, Hans Eberhard. 1972. "Studies in the History of Queen Melisende of Jerusalem." Dumbarton Oaks Papers 26: 93-182.
Takayama, Hiroshi. 1993. The Administration of the Norman Kingdom of Sicily. Leiden: E.J. Brill.
Wolf, Kenneth Baxter. 2005. The Deeds of Count Roger of Calabria and Sicily and of His Brother Duke Robert Guiscard. Ann Arbor: University of Michigan Press.

References

|-
 

 

1070s births
Place of birth missing
1118 deaths
Place of death missing
12th-century Sicilian people
Royal consorts of Sicily
12th-century women rulers
Remarried royal consorts
Christians of the Crusades
Queens consort of Jerusalem
Adelaide
Adelaide
11th-century Italian nobility
11th-century Italian women
12th-century Italian nobility
12th-century Italian women